P. giganteus may refer to:
 Pisaster giganteus, the giant sea star, a sea star species found along the western coast of North America
 Pteropus giganteus, the Indian flying-fox, a bat species found in Bangladesh, China, and India

Synonyms
 Priodontes giganteus, a synonym for Priodontes maximus, the giant armadillo, a mammal species